The Ministry of Tourism is a ministry in Zambia. It is headed by the Minister of Tourism.

In 2002 the Ministry of Tourism was merged with the Ministry of Environment and Natural Resources to form the Ministry of Tourism, Environment and Natural Resources. However, Tourism was later merged into the Foreign Affairs ministry. In 2011 Tourism was split out from the Foreign ministry and merged with the Art portfolio to form the Ministry of Tourism and Arts. Arts was removed in 2021 and moved to the Ministry of Youth, Sport and Arts.

The ministry oversees several statutory bodies, including the Hotels Board of Management, the Hotels Managers Registration Council, the National Heritage Conservation Commission, the National Museum Board, the Zambia Institute for Tourism and Hospitality Studies and the Zambia Tourism Agency.

List of ministers

Deputy ministers

References

External links
Official website

Tourism
Tourism in Zambia
Arts in Zambia
 
Zambia